Mortimer Montgomery Lee (May 28, 1846–) was a two-term Republican mayor of South Norwalk, Connecticut from 1894 to 1896 and from 1901 to 1902. He also served in the Connecticut House of Representatives from 1905 to 1907.

Early life and family 
Lee was born in the town of Farmington, Pennsylvania. 
He was the son of Alonzo and Almira A. Wright Lee. He received his education at the common schools, and also at Troupsburg Academy, Troupsburg, New York, and Union Academy, Knoxville, Pennsylvania. He became a member of the firm of Haughton & Lee of New York City, importer of lace, in 1880. He was vice-president of the Industrial Savings and Loan Company of New York.

References 

1846 births
Mayors of Norwalk, Connecticut
Republican Party members of the Connecticut House of Representatives
People from Fayette County, Pennsylvania
Year of death missing